The following is a list of reality television show franchises that have become franchises with production of local versions around the world, from A through G.

La Academia
Original name: La Academia
Origin: Mexico
Date started: June 30, 2002
Creator: Giorgio Aresu
First network to broadcast: Azteca 13
First country to adapt: Malaysia

The Amazing Race
Original name: The Amazing Race
Origin: USA
Date started: September 5, 2001
Creators: Bertram van Munster, Elise Doganieri
First network to broadcast: CBS
First country to adapt: Asian continent

NOTE: There was a planned Central European version, which was announced that it was to air in 2006 on AXN Central Europe. It was canceled and is therefore not included in the list.
Notes

The Apprentice
 Original name: The Apprentice
 Origin: U.S.
 Date started: January 8, 2004
 Creator: Mark Burnett
 First network to broadcast: NBC
 First country to adapt: Brazil

Bake Off
Original name: The Great British Bake Off
Origin: UK
Date started: 17 August 2010
First network to broadcast: BBC Two
First country to adapt: France

Current

Former

The Bar
Original name: Baren
Origin: Sweden
Date started: April 2000
Creator: Strix Television
First network to broadcast: TV3
First country to adapt: Norway

Bet on Your Baby
Original name: Bet on Your baby
Origin: United States
Date started: April, 13, 2013
Creator: Electus and 5x5 Media
First network to broadcast: ABC
First country to adapt: Turkey

Big Brother
Original name: Big Brother
Origin: Netherlands
Date started: September 16, 1999
Creator: John de Mol
First network to broadcast: Veronica
First country to adapt: Germany
Country with the most seasons: United States of America

The Biggest Loser
Original name: The Biggest Loser
Origin: United States
Date started: October 19, 2004
Creator: Dave Broome
First network to broadcast: NBC
First country to adapt: United Kingdom

Celebrity Splash!
Original name: Sterren Springen Op Zaterdag (Stars Jumping On Saturday)
Origin: Netherlands
Date started: 2012
Creator: Eyeworks
First network to broadcast: SBS 6

Clash of the Choirs
Original name: Clash of the Choirs
Origin: United States
Date started: December 17, 2007
Creator: Friday TV
First network to broadcast: NBC
First country to adapt: Sweden
Country with the most seasons: Sweden

Dancing with the Stars
Original name: Strictly Come Dancing
Origin: United Kingdom
Date started: May 15, 2004
First network to broadcast: BBC One
First country to adapt: Italy

Duets
 Original name: Duets
 Origin: United States of America
 Date started: May 24, 2012
 Creator: Keep Calm and Carry On Productions
 First network to broadcast: ABC
 First country to adapt: China

The Farm
Original name: Farmen
Origin: Sweden
Creator: Strix
First network to broadcast: TV4
First country to adapt: Sweden

Fear Factor
Original name: Now or Neverland
Origin: Netherlands
Date started: 1998
Creator: John de Mol
First network to broadcast: Veronica
First country to adapt: U.S.
Country with the most seasons: UK

Flip or Flop
Original name: Flip or Flop
Origin: USA
Date started: April 16, 2013
First network to broadcast: HGTV
Related series: Flip or Flop, Flip or Flop Atlanta, Flip or Flop Chicago, Flip or Flop Follow-Up, Flip or Flop Nashville, Flip or Flop Fort Worth, Flip or Flop Vegas

Got Talent
Original name: America's Got Talent
Origin: United States
Date started: June 21, 2006
Note: Britain's Got Talent was originally slated to be the first to be made but due to problems in production, America's Got Talent was eventually made first. 
Creator: Simon Cowell
First network to broadcast: NBC
First country to adapt: France
Country with the most seasons: United States

References

Lists of television series by genre

Lists of media franchises